Interrogation is a 1980 Soviet crime drama film directed by Rustam Ibragimbekov and Rasim Ojagov. The film premiered in April 1980 in Moscow.

Plot
Investigator Seifi Ganiev runs the case of an illegal mercery shop's head Murad Abiyev, who confessed to embezzlement of one million roubles from public funds.

Abiyev is also accused of the murder of an underage girl that occurred in Riga shortly after Abiyev saw her. He denies his guilt, but does not name the perpetrators though he knows them, even though he is facing the death penalty.

The investigator understands that some high-ranking officials stand behind Abiyev, but he has no proof.

Ganiev seeks to obtain from the prisoner the whole truth to bring the criminals to justice.

Cast 
 Alexander Kalyagin as Captain Seifi Ganiev
 Hasan Memmedov as Murad Abiev (voiced by Vyacheslav Tikhonov)
 Shafiga Mammadova as Gülya Ganieva
 Elena Prudnikova as Ayan Abieva
 Rasim Balayev as Police Colonel Elmar
 Tofik Mirzoev as Teymur
 Hasanagha Turabov as General
 Elkhan Agaguseynov as Dadashev
 Yevgeni Lebedev as Abiev's prison cell mate
 Gumrakh Rakhimov as Policeman

Awards
 1980 - 13th All-Union Film Festival: Grand Prize in the feature film section.

References

External links

Soviet-era Azerbaijanian films
Soviet crime drama films
Russian crime drama films
1980 crime drama films
1980 films
1980s Russian-language films
Azerbaijanfilm films
Films directed by Rasim Ojagov
Films about capital punishment